Ancy-le-Franc is a commune in the Yonne department in Bourgogne-Franche-Comté in north-central France.

See also
Château d'Ancy-le-Franc
Communes of the Yonne department

References

Communes of Yonne